Robert Morton is an American television producer most notable for his work as a producer and later co-executive producer of the NBC program Late Night with David Letterman.

Biography
Morton is a 1975 graduate of American University (Washington, DC). He served as the creative director for MTV prior to joining Letterman's staff.

Morton went with Letterman to CBS in 1993 to serve as executive producer of CBS' Late Show with David Letterman, but left the show in 1996. After leaving the Late Show, Morton has produced several programs, including Drew Carey's Green Screen Show, The Wayne Brady Show, Over the Top, and Mind of Mencia. He returned to late-night television when he took over as executive producer for Lopez Tonight on TBS in 2010.

Personal life
In 2001, he married restaurateur Jennifer Rush; they have two daughters, Billie Morton (b. 2001) and Emmy Morton (b. 2006); they divorced in 2016.

References

American television producers
Late Show with David Letterman
American University alumni
Living people
Year of birth missing (living people)
Late Night with David Letterman